Clepsiphron is a genus of moths in the family Geometridae.

Species
 Clepsiphron calycopis Turner, 1922

References
 Clepsiphron at Markku Savela's Lepidoptera and Some Other Life Forms
 Natural History Museum Lepidoptera genus database

Ennominae